The  Yamaha KT100 is a 100 cc two-stroke cycle kart engine made by Yamaha that has also been adapted for ultralight aircraft use.

Design and development
The KT100 is a simple and rugged air-cooled engine that uses piston-ported intake induction with a Walbro WB-3A carburetor. The KT100 is a popular high-performance two-stroke kart racing engine. It comes in various forms used in many countries. The KT100J is slightly smaller with fewer options in comparison to its bigger brother, the KT100SE.

The KT100 is a very versatile engine using different exhaust systems and carburetors through a large range of classes. The KT100 can be tuned for most series and organizations with maximum and minimum rules.

Aircraft use
In the late 1970s and early 1980s the engine was adapted for use on ultralight aircraft. The ultralights of that era were lighter and had much lower wing loadings than today, making flight practical on the KT100's  developed at 10,000 rpm. In aircraft use it was usually equipped with a recoil starter and a belt reduction drive.

Applications
Skyhigh Skybaby
Striplin Lone Ranger
Swallow Aeroplane Company Swallow A
Ultralite Soaring Wizard
Volmer VJ-24W SunFun

Specifications (KT100S)

References

External links

Air-cooled aircraft piston engines
Two-stroke aircraft piston engines
KT100